Darkwell is a gothic metal band from Innsbruck, Austria. Formed in 1999 by bassist Roland Wurzer and guitarist Roman Wienicke. Soon after formation, they signed with Napalm Records and released their first album, Suspiria, in 2000. Before the release of Conflict of Interest in 2002 they toured across Europe with Tristania, The Sins of Thy Beloved, Graveworm, and Vintersorg. Supporting their second full-length album, Metatron, they again toured across Europe, with Atrocity, Leaves' Eyes, and Battlelore.

Line-up

Current line-up 
 Alexandra Pittracher - vocals
 Mathias Nussbaum - guitar
 Moritz Neuner - drums
 Raphael Lepuschitz - keyboard
 Roland Wurzer - bass guitar (Founding member)

Former members 
 Stephanie Luzie (Meier) - vocals
 Christian Filip - keyboard
 Roman Wienicke - guitar (Founding member)

Discography

Studio albums
Suspiria (2000)
Metatron (2004)
Moloch (2016)

EPs
Conflict of Interest (2002)

Singles
"Strange" (2004)

Videos
"The Crucible" (2003)
"Fate Prisoner" (2004)

References

External links 
Darkwell at Napalm Records

Austrian gothic metal musical groups
Musical groups established in 1999
Musical quintets
Austrian heavy metal musical groups
1999 establishments in Austria